Zürich Saalsporthalle is a railway station in the Swiss city of Zürich, adjacent to the Sihlcity shopping mall and the Saalsporthalle sports hall. The station is on the Sihltal line which is operated by the Sihltal Zürich Uetliberg Bahn (SZU).

The station is served by the following passenger trains:

Adjacent stops are served by tram routes 5 and 13 of the Zürich tram network.

References

External links 
 

Saalsporthalle